Henry V is a history play by William Shakespeare, believed to have been written near 1599. It tells the story of King Henry V of England, focusing on events immediately before and after the Battle of Agincourt (1415) during the Hundred Years' War. In the First Quarto text, it was titled The Cronicle History of Henry the fift, and The Life of Henry the Fifth in the First Folio text.

The play is the final part of a tetralogy, preceded by Richard II, Henry IV, Part 1, and Henry IV, Part 2. The original audiences would thus have already been familiar with the title character, who was depicted in the Henry IV plays as a wild, undisciplined young man. In Henry V, the young prince has matured. He embarks on an expedition to France and, his army badly outnumbered, defeats the French at Agincourt.

Characters

 Chorus

The English
 King Henry V
 Duke of Gloucester – Henry's brother
 Duke of Bedford – Henry's brother
 Duke of Clarence – Henry's brother
 Duke of Exeter – Henry's uncle
 Duke of York  – Henry's cousin
 Earl of Salisbury
 Earl of Westmorland
 Earl of Warwick
 Sir Thomas Erpingham
 Capt. Gower – an Englishman
 Capt. Fluellen – a Welshman
 Capt. Macmorris – an Irishman
 Capt. Jamy – a Scot
 John Bates, Alexander Court and Michael Williams – soldiers
 Herald
 Pistol, Nym, and Bardolph – soldiers, former followers of Sir John Falstaff
 Boy  – formerly Sir John Falstaff's page
 Mistress Quickly – hostess of the Boar's Head tavern, and Pistol's wife
 Archbishop of Canterbury
 Bishop of Ely

The traitors
 Earl of Cambridge  – Henry's cousin
 Lord Scrope
 Sir Thomas Grey

The French
 King of France
 Queen Isabel
 Louis, Duke of Guyenne, the dauphin – their son and the Dauphin of France
 Catharine – their daughter
 Alice – Catharine's lady-in-waiting
 Constable of France
 Duke of Bourbon / Duke of Brittany (depending on the edition of the play)
 Duke of Orléans
 Duke of Berry
 Duke of Burgundy
 Lord Rambures
 Lord Grandpré
 Monsieur le Fer – French soldier
 Montjoy – French herald
 Governor of Harfleur
 French Ambassadors
Soldiers, servants, attendants, and lords

Synopsis

The Elizabethan stage lacked scenery. The play begins with a Prologue, in which the Chorus (a lone speaker addressing the audience) apologizes for the limitations of the theatre, wishing for "a Muse of fire", with real princes and a kingdom for a stage, to do justice to King Henry's story.  Then, says the Chorus, King Henry would "[a]ssume the port [bearing] of Mars". The Chorus encourages the audience to use their "imaginary forces" to overcome the limitations of the stage: "Piece out our imperfections with your thoughts ... turning the accomplishment of many years / Into an hour-glass".

Shakespeare's plays are in five acts. In Henry V, the first act deals largely with the king and his decision to invade France, persuaded that through ancestry, he is the rightful heir to the French throne. The French Dauphin, son of King Charles VI, answers Henry's claims with a condescending and insulting gift of tennis balls, "as matching to his youth and vanity".

The Chorus reappears at the beginning of each act to advance the story. At the beginning of Act II, he describes the country's dedication to the war effort: "Now all the youth of England are on fire... They sell the pasture now to buy the horse, / Following the mirror of all Christian kings ...." Act II includes a plot by the Earl of Cambridge and two comrades to assassinate Henry at Southampton. Henry's clever uncovering of the plot and his ruthless treatment of the conspirators show that he has changed from the earlier plays in which he appeared.

In Act III Henry and his troops besiege the French port of Harfleur after crossing the English Channel. The Chorus appears again: "Grapple your minds to sternage of this navy/And leave your England, as dead midnight still". The French king, says the Chorus, "doth offer him / Catharine his daughter, and with her, to dowry, / Some petty and unprofitable dukedoms." Henry is not satisfied.

At the siege of Harfleur, the English are beaten back at first, but Henry urges them on with one of Shakespeare's best-known speeches. "Once more unto the breach, dear friends, once more; / Or close the wall up with our English dead...." After a bloody siege, the English take Harfleur, but Henry's forces are so depleted that he decides not to go on to Paris. Instead, he decides to move up the coast to Calais. The French assemble a powerful army and pursue him.

They surround him near the small town of Agincourt, and in Act IV, the night before the battle, knowing he is outnumbered, Henry wanders around the English camp in disguise, trying to comfort his soldiers and determine what they really think of him. He agonizes about the moral burden of being king, asking God to "steel my soldiers' hearts". Daylight comes, and Henry rallies his nobles with the famous St Crispin's Day Speech (Act IV Scene iii 18–67): "We few, we happy few, we band of brothers". The French herald Montjoy returns to ask if Henry will surrender and avoid certain defeat, and ransom his men's survival; Henry bids him "bear my former answer back", saying the French will get no ransom from him "but these my joints".

Shakespeare does not describe the battle in the play. Though the French in one scene complain that 'Tout est perdu', the outcome is not clear to Henry, until the French Herald Montjoy tells him the 'day is yours'. The battle turns out to be a lop-sided victory: the French suffered 10,000 casualties; the English, fewer than 30. "O God, thy arm was here," says Henry.

Act V comes several years later, as the English and French negotiate the Treaty of Troyes, and Henry tries to woo the French princess, Catherine of Valois. Neither speaks the other's language well, but the humour of their mistakes actually helps achieve his aim. The scene ends with the French king adopting Henry as heir to the French throne, and the prayer of the French queen "that English may as French, French Englishmen, receive each other, God speak this Amen."

The play concludes with a final appearance of the Chorus who foreshadows the tumultuous reign of Henry's son Henry VI of England, "whose state so many had the managing, that they lost France, and made his England bleed, which oft our stage hath shown". Shakespeare had previously brought this tale to the stage in a trilogy of plays: Henry VI Part 1, Henry VI Part 2, and Henry VI Part 3.

As in many of Shakespeare's history and tragedy plays, a number of minor comic characters appear, contrasting with and sometimes commenting on the main plot. In this case, they are mostly common soldiers in Henry's army, and they include Pistol, Nym, and Bardolph from the Henry IV plays. The army also includes a Scot, an Irishman, and an Englishman, and Fluellen, a comically stereotyped Welsh soldier. The play also deals briefly with the death of Sir John Falstaff, Henry's estranged friend from the Henry IV plays, whom Henry had rejected at the end of Henry IV, Part 2.

Sources
Shakespeare's primary source for Henry V, as for most of his chronicle histories, was Raphael Holinshed's Chronicles; the publication of the second edition in 1587 provides a terminus post quem for the play. Edward Hall's The Union of the Two Illustrious Families of Lancaster and York appears also to have been consulted, and scholars have supposed that Shakespeare was familiar with Samuel Daniel's poem on the civil wars. An earlier play, the Famous Victories of Henry V is also generally believed to have been a model for the work.

Date and text

On the basis of an apparent allusion to Essex's mission to quell Tyrone's Rebellion, the play is thought to date from early 1599. The Chronicle History of Henry the fifth was entered into the Register of the Stationers Company on 14 August 1600 by the bookseller Thomas Pavier; the first quarto was published before the end of the year—though by Thomas Millington and John Busby rather than Pavier. Thomas Creede did the printing.

Q1 of Henry V is a "bad quarto", a shortened version of the play that might be an infringing copy or reported text. A second quarto, a reprint of Q1, was published in 1602 by Pavier; another reprint was issued as Q3 in 1619, with a false date of 1608—part of William Jaggard's False Folio. The superior text was first printed in the First Folio in 1623.

Criticism and analysis

Views on warfare

Readers and audiences have interpreted the play's attitude to warfare in several different ways. On the one hand, it seems to celebrate Henry's invasion of France and military prowess. Alternatively, it can be read as a commentary on the moral and personal cost of war. Gathered, Shakespeare presents warfare in all its complexity.

The American critic Norman Rabkin described the play as a picture with two simultaneous meanings. Rabkin argues that the play never settles on one viewpoint towards warfare, Henry himself switching his style of speech constantly, talking of "rape and pillage" during Harfleur, but of patriotic glory in his St Crispin's Day Speech.

Some scholars have connected the nationalistic glorification of warfare with contemporary military ventures in Spain and Ireland. The Chorus directly refers to the looked-for military triumphs of the Earl of Essex, in the fifth act. Henry V himself is sometimes seen as an ambivalent representation of the stage machiavel, combining apparent sincerity with a willingness to use deceit and force to attain his ends.

Other commentators see the play as looking critically at the reason for Henry's violent cause. The noble words of the Chorus and Henry are consistently undermined by the actions of Pistol, Bardolph, and Nym. Pistol talks in a bombastic blank verse that seems to parody Henry's own style of speech. Pistol and his friends, thus, show up the actions of their rulers. Indeed, the presence of the Eastcheap characters from Henry IV has been said to emphasise the element of adventurer in Henry's character as monarch.

The play's ambiguity has led to diverse interpretations in performance. Laurence Olivier's 1944 film, made during the Second World War, emphasises the patriotic side, ignoring the fact that the enemy of the play, the French, were in fact allies in that conflict, while Kenneth Branagh's 1989 film stresses the horrors of war. A 2003 Royal National Theatre production featured Henry as a modern war general, ridiculing the Iraq invasion.

In recent years, there has been scholarly debate about whether or not Henry V can be labeled a war criminal. Some denounce the question as anachronistic, arguing that contemporary legal terminology cannot be applied to historical events or figures like those depicted in the play. However, other scholars have supported the proposed viewpoint. For instance, Christopher N. Warren looks to Alberico Gentili's De armis Romanis, along with Henry V itself, to show how early modern thinkers (including Shakespeare) were themselves using juridical approaches to engage with the past. As a result, Warren argues, the question of whether Henry V was a war criminal is not only legitimate, but also "historically appropriate".

In a rhetorical display intended to intimidate the Governor of Harfleur into surrendering the city to the English, Henry denies personal responsibility for his soldiers' actions if battle is resumed — "What rein can hold licentious wickedness / When down the hill he holds his fierce career?" — and describes in graphic detail the violence they will do to the townsfolk if his demands are not met:

The gates of mercy shall be all shut up,

And the flesh’d soldier, rough and hard of heart,

In liberty of bloody hand shall range

With conscience wide as hell, mowing like grass

Your fresh, fair virgins and your flowering infants.

—Act III, Scene iii.

On the other hand, Henry is portrayed as a great leader, as he keeps his temper when insulted: "we are glad the Dauphin is so pleasant with us". He also admits to his past mistakes: "did give ourselves to barbarous licence" and is shown to have great confidence: "I will rise there with so full a glory that I will dazzle all the eyes of France".

A mock trial of for the crimes associated with the legality of the invasion and the slaughter of prisoners was held in Washington, DC in March 2010, drawing from both historical record and Shakespeare's play. Titled The Supreme Court of the Amalgamated Kingdom of England and France, participating judges were Justices Samuel Alito and Ruth Bader Ginsburg. The outcome was originally to be determined by an audience vote, but due to a draw, it came down to a judges' decision. The court was divided on Henry's justification for war, but unanimously found him guilty on the killing of the prisoners after applying "the evolving standards of the maturing society". Previously, the fictional Global War Crimes Tribunal ruled that Henry's war was legal, no noncombatant was killed unlawfully, and Henry bore no criminal responsibility for the death of the POWs. The fictional French Civil Liberties Union, who had instigated the tribunal, then attempted to sue in civil court. The judge concluded that he was bound by the GWCT's conclusions of law and also ruled in favour of the English. The Court of Appeals affirmed without opinion, thus leaving the matter for the Supreme Court's determination.

French language
Very brief snippets of Henry V are written originally in the French language; Act 5, Scene 2 is an example.

Performance history

The Chorus refers to Essex's 1599 campaign in Ireland without any sense that it would end in disaster. The campaign began in late March and was scuttled by late June, strongly suggesting that the play was first performed during that three-month period.

A tradition, impossible to verify, holds that Henry V was the first play performed at the new Globe Theatre in the spring of 1599—the Globe would have been the "wooden O" mentioned in the Prologue—but Shapiro argues that the Chamberlain's Men were still at The Curtain when the work was first performed, and that Shakespeare himself probably acted the Chorus. In 1600, the first printed text states that the play had been played "sundry times". The earliest performance for which an exact date is known, however, occurred on 7 January 1605, at Court at Whitehall Palace.

Samuel Pepys saw a Henry V in 1664, but it was written by Roger Boyle, 1st Earl of Orrery, not by Shakespeare. Shakespeare's play returned to the stage in 1723, in an adaptation by Aaron Hill.

The longest-running production of the play in Broadway history was the staging starring Richard Mansfield in 1900 which ran for 54 performances. Other notable stage performances of Henry V include Charles Kean (1859), Charles Alexander Calvert (1872), and Walter Hampden (1928).

Major revivals in London during the 20th and 21st centuries include:

 1900 Lyceum Theatre, Lewis Waller as Henry
 1914 Shaftesbury Theatre, F. R. Benson as Henry
 1916 His Majesty's Theatre, Martin Harvey as Henry
 1920 Strand Theatre, Murray Carrington as Henry
 1926 Old Vic Theatre, Baliol Holloway as Henry
 1928 Lyric, Hammersmith, Lewis Casson as Henry (Old Vic Company)
 1931 Old Vic Theatre, Ralph Richardson as Henry
 1934 Alhambra Theatre, Godfrey Tearle as Henry
 1936 Ring, Blackfriars, Hubert Gregg as Henry
 1937 Old Vic Theatre, Laurence Olivier as Henry
 1938 Drury Lane Theatre, Ivor Novello as Henry
 1951 Old Vic Theatre, Alec Clunes as Henry
 1955 Old Vic Theatre, Richard Burton as Henry
 1956 Stratford Shakespeare Festival, Christopher Plummer as Henry, with William Shatner as his understudy who substituted for him in one performance
 1960 Mermaid Theatre, William Peacock as Henry
 1960 Old Vic Theatre, Donald Houston as Henry
 1965 Aldwych Theatre, Ian Holm as Henry (Royal Shakespeare Company)
 1972 Aldwych Theatre, Timothy Dalton as Henry (Prospect Theatre Company), also in 1974 in Roundhouse Theatre
 1976 Aldwych Theatre, Alan Howard as Henry (Royal Shakespeare Company)
 1985 Barbican Theatre, Kenneth Branagh as Henry (Royal Shakespeare Company)
 2003 Royal National Theatre, Adrian Lester as Henry
 2013 Noël Coward Theatre, Jude Law as Henry (Michael Grandage Company)
 2015 RSC and The Barbican, Alex Hassell as Henry
 2022 Donmar Warehouse, Kit Harington as Henry

In the Shakespeare's Globe's 2012 Globe to Globe festival, Henry V was the UK entry, one of 37 and the only one performed in spoken English. Jamie Parker performed the role of Henry.

On British television, the play has been performed as:
 1951 Clement McCallin as Henry, Marius Goring as Chorus, Willoughby Gray as Pistol
 1953 Colin George as Henry, Toby Robertson as Chorus, Frank Windsor as Pistol
 1957 John Neville as Henry, Bernard Hepton as Chorus, Geoffrey Bayldon as Pistol
 1960 Robert Hardy as Henry, William Squire as Chorus, George A. Cooper as Pistol
 1979 David Gwillim as Henry, Alec McCowen as Chorus, Bryan Pringle as Pistol, part of the BBC Television Shakespeare series
 2012 Tom Hiddleston as Henry, John Hurt as Chorus, Paul Ritter as Pistol, part of The Hollow Crown TV series.
In 2017, the Pop-up Globe, the world's first temporary replica of the second Globe Theatre, based in Auckland, New Zealand, performed 34 Henry V shows. London-trained Australian actor Chris Huntly-Turner took on the role of Henry, Irish actor Michael Mahony as Chorus, and UK–New Zealand actor Edward Newborn as Pistol/King of France.

Adaptations

Film 
Three major film adaptations have been made. The first, Henry V (1944), directed by and starring Laurence Olivier, is a colourful and highly stylised version which begins in the Globe Theatre and then gradually shifts to a realistic evocation of the Battle of Agincourt. Olivier's film was made during the Second World War and was intended as a patriotic rallying cry at the time of the invasion of Normandy.

The second major film, Henry V (1989), directed by and starring Kenneth Branagh, attempts to give a more realistic evocation of the period, and lays more emphasis on the horrors of war. It features a mud-spattered and gruesome Battle of Agincourt.

The third major film, The King (2019), starring Timothée Chalamet as Henry V, was adapted from Shakespeare's plays Henry IV Part I, Henry IV Part II, and Henry V.

Television 
In 2012, the BBC commissioned a television adaptation of the play as part of The Hollow Crown series. It was part of a tetralogy that televised the entirety of Shakespeare's Henriad. Produced by Sam Mendes and directed by Thea Sharrock, it starred Tom Hiddleston as Henry V, who had played Prince Hal in The Hollow Crown's adaptations of Henry IV, Part I and Henry IV, Part II. The BBC scheduled the screening of Shakespeare's history plays as part of the 2012 Cultural Olympiad, a celebration of British culture coinciding with the 2012 Summer Olympics.

Dance 
In 2004, post-modern choreographer David Gordon created a dance-theatre version of the play called Dancing Henry Five, which mixed William Walton's music written for the Olivier film, recorded speeches from the film itself and by Christopher Plummer, and commentary written by Gordon.  The piece premiered at Danspace Project in New York, where it was compared favorably to a production of Henry IV (parts 1 and 2) at Lincoln Center. It has been revived three times—in 2005, 2007, and 2011—playing cities across the United States, and received a National Endowment for the Arts American Masterpieces in Dance Award.

Music 
Suite from Henry V is a 1963 orchestral arrangement of music that composer William Walton wrote for the 1944 Olivier film.  The arrangement is by Muir Mathieson, and is in five movements.

Henry V – A Shakespeare Scenario is a 50-minute work for narrator, SATB chorus, boys' choir (optional), and full orchestra.  The musical content is taken from Walton's score for the Olivier film, edited by David Lloyd-Jones and arranged by Christopher Palmer.  It was first performed at the Royal Festival Hall in London, in May 1990.  Performers for this premiere were Christopher Plummer (narrator), the Academy Chorus, Choristers of Westminster Cathedral, and Academy of St Martin-in-the-Fields. The conductor was Sir Neville Marriner.  A CD of the work with these performers was released by Chandos in 1990.

O For a Muse of Fire is a symphonic overture for full orchestra and vocal soloist, written by Darryl Kubian.  The work is 12 minutes long, and was premiered by the New Jersey Symphony Orchestra in March 2015. The work is scored for full orchestra, with vocal soloist. The vocal part incorporates selected lines from the text, and the vocal range is adaptable to different voice types. The soloist for the premiere performances with the New Jersey Symphony was former October Project lead singer (and former Sony Classical artist) Mary Fahl.

Explanatory notes

References

Further reading

External links

 
 Fully edited texts of Henry V, both original-spelling and modernised, at the Internet Shakespeare Editions
 
 

1599 plays
British plays adapted into films
Cultural depictions of Henry V of England
English Renaissance plays
Hundred Years' War in fiction
Plays about English royalty
Plays set in England
Plays set in the 15th century
Shakespearean histories